Gangadhar Ramchandra Pathak (born 1923) was an Indian writer, poet and historian, most notable for his works Antara (1962), Śaktiketu (1962) and Apaṅgā (1965).

List of works 
 Antara (1962)
 Śaktiketu (1962)
 Daivarekhā, Kādambarī (1964)
 Apaṅgā (1965)
 Dhanañjaya ; tīna aṅkī sāmājika nāṭaka (1966)
 Kan̂cana : saras sāmājik kādambari (1974)
 Gokhale kulavr̥ttānta (1978)

References 

1923 births
Possibly living people
20th-century Indian historians
Indian poets
20th-century Indian male writers
Poets from Maharashtra
Marathi-language poets
Marathi-language writers
Marathi novelists
Dramatists and playwrights from Maharashtra
Novelists from Maharashtra